Anton Ivanovich Ivanov-Goluboy (1818-) was a Russian painter.

Biography
Anton Ivanov was born a serf in a village of Kozakovo, Vladimir gubernia. From 1833 he studied painting in Saint Petersburg with Chernetsov's brothers. In 1838 he accompanied them on a trip on Volga River. In 1841 he was redeemed from serfdom by Chernetsov's brothers. From 1841 to 1849 he was a pensioner of the Imperial Academy of Arts. From 1846 he lived in Italy. He died in Rome and buried at the Monte-Testacho cemetery.

See also
 List of Russian artists

References
Anton Ivanov article in  Artcyclopedia
Genealogia.ru

19th-century painters from the Russian Empire
Russian male painters
1818 births
1863 deaths
19th-century male artists from the Russian Empire